Nagrota Assembly constituency is one of the 87 constituencies in the Jammu and Kashmir Legislative Assembly of Jammu and Kashmir a north state of India. Nagrota is also part of Jammu Lok Sabha constituency.

Members of the Legislative Assembly

Election results

2014

See also
 Nagrota
 List of constituencies of Jammu and Kashmir Legislative Assembly

References

Assembly constituencies of Jammu and Kashmir
Jammu district